Afrojavanica is a genus of tiger moths in the family Erebidae.  The moths have a curious, disruptive distribution in northeast Africa (Ethiopia) and Sundaland (Java).

Species
 Afrojavanica kostlani (Gaede, 1923)
 Afrojavanica melaena (Hampson, 1901)
 Afrojavanica melaenoides (Rothschild, 1935)

Spilosomina
Moth genera